Ski orienteering has been featured as a sport in the Asian Winter Games since the 7th winter games in 2011.

Events

Medal table

Participating nations

List of medalists

References 
 2011 Asian Winter Games at International Orienteering Federation website

 
Sports at the Asian Winter Games
Asian Winter Games
Asian Games orienteering